Capnolymma stygia is a species of beetle in the family Cerambycidae. It was described by Pascoe in 1858.

References

Beetles described in 1858
Lepturinae